Harohalli  is a Town in the southern state of Karnataka, India. It is located in the Harohalli taluk of Ramanagar district in Karnataka.

Demographics
As of the 2001 India census, Harohalli had a population of 7,888, with 4,054 males and 3,834 females.

French cemetery
There is a French cemetery in Harohalli, where the French who came to aid Tipu Sultan in the Anglo-Mysore Wars are buried. The land for the French cemetery was granted by the sultan. The interned French soldiers and family members mostly died from malaria, fatigue or in battle. The cemetery, more than 250 years old, has fallen into neglect and vandalism. Only 35 graves remain. Iron grilles, bricks, metal plaques and expensive marble have been removed from the graves, and many have no headstone.

KIADB Harohalli Industrial Area 
The Karnataka Industrial Areas Development Board (KIADB) approved layout dates for phase 1 of the Harohalli industrial area on 3 October 2005. Consequently, phase 2 of the project was approved on 19 August 2008. KIADB’s proposal is to build a multi-product industrial park encompassing about 904.86 hectares as part of combined development of phase II and III of Harohalli industrial park.

See also
 Mysore
 Districts of Karnataka

References

Villages in Mysore district